Sugar Loaf Brewery or Bub's Brewery is a former brewery in Winona, Minnesota, United States.  It was established in 1862 at the foot of Sugar Loaf, the prominent river bluff from which it took its name.  The extant brewery complex, which includes storage caves dug into the bluff, dates from 1872 when the original building was destroyed by fire and a replacement built.  The brewery was listed on the National Register of Historic Places in 1978 for its local significance in the theme of industry.  It was nominated for its association with prominent local brewer Peter Bub (d. 1911) and his successors, who produced beer on the site until 1969.

The building has been converted into an antique mall, Treasures Under Sugar Loaf.

See also
 National Register of Historic Places listings in Winona County, Minnesota
 List of defunct breweries in the United States

References

External links
 Treasures Under Sugar Loaf

1862 establishments in Minnesota
1969 disestablishments in Minnesota
Beer brewing companies based in Minnesota
Brewery buildings in the United States
Buildings and structures in Winona, Minnesota
Defunct brewery companies of the United States
Industrial buildings and structures on the National Register of Historic Places in Minnesota
Industrial buildings completed in 1872
National Register of Historic Places in Winona County, Minnesota
1872 establishments in Minnesota